"After All the Good Is Gone" is a song written and recorded by American country music artist Conway Twitty.  It was released in March 1976 as the first single from the album Now and Then.  The song was Twitty's 16th number one on the country chart.  The single stayed at number one for a single week and spent a total of 11 weeks on the country chart.

Personnel
Conway Twitty — vocals
Joe E. Lewis, The Nashville Sounds — vocals
Harold Bradley — 6-string electric bass guitar
Ray Edenton — acoustic guitar
Johnny Gimble — fiddle
John Hughey — steel guitar
Tommy Markham — drums
Grady Martin — electric guitar
Bob Moore — bass
Hargus "Pig" Robbins — piano

Charts

Weekly charts

Year-end charts

References

1976 singles
1976 songs
Conway Twitty songs
Songs written by Conway Twitty
Song recordings produced by Owen Bradley
MCA Records singles